Alejandro Francés Torrijo (born 1 August 2002) is a Spanish footballer who plays as a central defender for Real Zaragoza.

Club career
Francés was born in Zaragoza, Aragon, and was a Real Zaragoza youth graduate. On 17 December 2019, before even having appeared for the B-side, he made his made his first team debut by starting in a 1–0 away win against UD Socuéllamos, for the season's Copa del Rey; along with fellow debutant Andrés Borge, both became the first players of the 21st century to appear for the club.

Francés made his professional debut on 21 January 2020, coming on as a late substitute for Pichu Atienza in a 3–1 home win over RCD Mallorca, also for the national cup. Five days later, he first appeared with the B-team by starting in a 1–2 Tercera División home loss against SD Tarazona.

Francés made his Segunda División on 16 June 2020, starting in a 3–1 away win against CD Lugo. On 20 August, he renewed his contract until 2024, being definitely promoted to the main squad. The following February, he was given a permanent first team place after receiving the number 6 jersey.

International career
Francés represented the Spain under-17s at the 2019 FIFA U-17 World Cup, making two appearances.

References

External links

2002 births
Living people
Footballers from Zaragoza
Spanish footballers
Association football central defenders
Segunda División players
Tercera División players
Real Zaragoza B players
Real Zaragoza players
Spain youth international footballers
Spain under-21 international footballers